Mišak is a surname. Notable people with the surname include:

 Iva Mišak (born 1993), Croatian alpine skier
 Krešimir Mišak (born 1972), Croatian journalist, musician, and author
 Patrik Mišák (born 1991), Slovak footballer

See also
 
 Misak (disambiguation)

Croatian surnames
Slovak-language surnames